Les Plus Beaux Villages de Wallonie (French; in English: "The Most Beautiful Villages of Wallonia") is a non-profit organisation formed in 1994 to promote, protect and develop a number of villages in Wallonia, Belgium.

The association is inspired by the organisation Les plus beaux villages de France and is established as an ASBL in Belgium.

Les Plus Beaux Villages de Wallonie organises events such as Un Dimanche, un Beau Village ("one Sunday, one beautiful village"), where one village is highlighted and promoted each week, and activities take place to allow visitors to explore the culture and heritage of the village.

List of villages
The following villages are presently members of Les Plus Beaux Villages de Wallonie:

See also
 Les Plus Beaux Villages de France
 I Borghi più belli d'Italia
 Association des plus beaux villages du Québec

References

External links
 Official site

Tourist attractions in Wallonia
Tourism in Belgium
Environmental organisations based in Belgium
1994 establishments in Belgium
Organizations established in 1994